The Saint-Anne Seignorial Estate is a historic manorial estate located in Sainte-Anne-de-la-Perade, Quebec, on the north shore of the Saint Lawrence river, in Mauricie, Quebec, Canada.

It includes the ruins of the old manor house.

Since 2003, it has presented a permanent exhibition "When the story is told ...". This exhibition traces the story of three famous people who lived in the Domaine seigneurial: Madeleine de Verchères, heroine of Fort Verchères; the artist Elizabeth Hale, wife of politician John Hale; and Honoré Mercier, Premier of Quebec from 1887 to 1891.

Since 1995, the site has been run by the "Society of Madeleine Verchères site". The mission of the hosts is to conserve, manage, facilitate and promote the historical site. Every summer, a temporary art exhibition is also presented in the lobby of the "manorial Domaine Sainte-Anne".

See also 

 Lordship of Sainte-Anne-de-la-Perade

Notes and references

External links 

 
 

Houses in Quebec
Buildings and structures in Mauricie
Les Chenaux Regional County Municipality
Heritage sites in Quebec (Cultural Heritage Act)
Ruins in Canada